Jammu West Assembly constituency is one of the 87 constituencies in the Jammu and Kashmir Legislative Assembly.

Members of Legislative Assembly

Election results

2014

References

Assembly constituencies of Jammu and Kashmir